Glenwood High School may refer to:

in Australia
Glenwood High School (Australia), Glenwood, NSW, Australia

in Scotland
Glenwood High School, Glenrothes, Glenrothes, Fife, Scotland

in South Africa
Glenwood High School (Durban), Durban, South Africa
Glenwood High School (Pretoria), Pretoria, South Africa

in the United States
(by state)
Glenwood High School (Alabama), Phenix City, Alabama
Glenwood High School (Arkansas), Glenwood, Arkansas
Glenwood High School (Georgia), Glenwood, Georgia
Glenwood High School (Illinois), Chatham, Illinois
Glenwood High School (Iowa), Glenwood, Iowa
Glenwood High School (Ohio), New Boston, Ohio